The episodes listed below are from the animated television series Beast Wars: Transformers. The series premiered on September 16, 1996 and ended on March 7, 1999, with a total of 52 episodes over the course of 3 seasons.

Series overview

Episodes

Season 1 (1996–97)

Season 2 (1997–98)

Season 3 (1998–99)

External links
 

Lists of American children's animated television series episodes
Episodes
Lists of Canadian children's animated television series episodes
Beast Wars